Hypaetha is a genus of tiger beetles containing the following species: Most species are found on coastal sand beaches.

 Hypaetha antiqua (Lea, 1917)
 Hypaetha biramosa (Fabricius, 1781)
 Hypaetha copulata (Schmidt-Goebel, 1846)
 Hypaetha frenchi (Sloane, 1904)
 Hypaetha immanis (Bates, 1874)
 Hypaetha intricata (Dejean, 1831)
 Hypaetha montraveli (Blanchard, 1842)
 Hypaetha ornatipennis (Schilder, 1953)
 Hypaetha quadrilineata (Fabricius, 1781)
 Hypaetha schmidti (W. Horn, 1927)
 Hypaetha singularis (Chaudoir, 1876)
 Hypaetha upsilon (Dejean, 1825)

References

Cicindelidae
Carabidae genera